Belafonte...Live! is a live double album by Harry Belafonte, released by RCA Records in 1972.

Track listing 
 "Look Over Yonder/Be My Woman, Gal" – 6:16	 
 "Mr. Bojangles" (Jerry Jeff Walker) – 5:16	 
 "Suzanne" (Leonard Cohen) – 6:18	 
 "Pastures of Plenty" (Woody Guthrie) – 4:47	 
 "Wedding Song" (Paul Stookey) – 4:20	 
 "Mahlalela" – 4:30	 
 "Nonqonqo" – 3:00	 
 "Mamani" – 5:15	 
 "Qonqoza" – 3:03	 
 "Out de Fire" – 11:33	 
 "Brother Moses" – 2:28	  
 "Someone Is Standin' Outside" – 3:55	  
 "Oh Brother" – 3:47	  
 "Carnival Medley:" – 17:20
 "Don't Stop the Carnival"
 "Jean and Dinah"
 "Mama Look a Boo-Boo"
 "Jump In the Line"
 "Marianne"
 "Sly Mongoose"
 "Zombie Jamboree"	 
 "Abraham, Martin & John" (Dick Holler) – 5:02

Personnel 
 Harry Belafonte – vocals
 Letta Mbulu – vocals on "Mahlalela", "Nonqonqo", "Mamani", "Qonqoza"
 Ella Mitchell – vocals on "Brother Moses", "Someone Is Standin' Outside", "Oh Brother"
 Sivuca – vocals, accordion on "Carnival Medley"
 The Howard Roberts Chorale – vocals
Production notes:
 Jack Pleis – producer
 John Cartwright – producer, musical director
 Jack Feeney – executive producer
 George Semkiw – engineer
 Bob Simpson – engineer
 Hayward Parrott – engineer
 Paul Emile Mongeau – engineer
 Ron Evans  – liner notes

References 

Harry Belafonte live albums
1972 live albums
RCA Records live albums
Albums produced by Jack Pleis